Arthur Leclerc (born 14 October 2000) is a Monégasque racing driver currently racing for DAMS in the 2023 Formula 2 Championship. He is the younger brother of Scuderia Ferrari Formula One driver Charles Leclerc, and a member of Ferrari Driver Academy. He most recently competed in the FIA Formula 3 Championship with Prema Racing. He is runner-up during the 2020 Formula Regional European Championship and the 2022 Formula Regional Asian champion.

Career

Karting 
Not much is known about Leclerc's karting career, although he won the Kart Racing Academy championship in 2014.

French F4 

In 2018, Leclerc raced in the French F4 Championship. He finished fifth in the championship with two race wins. He started his racing career at the relative late age of 17, as his family focused on getting his brother Charles to Formula One. Leclerc was immediately on form, as he claimed his first single-seater win in just his second race. However, the championship was dominated by eventual Caio Collet and he only took one more win at Magny-Cours. Nevertheless, Leclerc claimed an additional six podiums, ending fifth in the championship.

Formula E 
Leclerc was a development driver in FIA Formula E championship during the  2017–18 Formula E season for Venturi Racing. By doing so, he was given access to Venturi's simulators and personal development systems. Leclerc was retained for the 2018–19 Formula E season. Leclerc did his first public test for Venturi at the 2019 Formula E Rookie Test at the Marrakech Street Circuit.  For the 2019–20 Formula E season Venturi announced Leclerc as their test driver for the season. Leclerc's involvement in Formula E ended after the season.

ADAC Formula 4 
Leclerc competed in the ADAC Formula 4 Championship in 2019 for US Racing-CHRS outfit. During the second race, a mistake on the final lap saw Leclerc lose a chance at his maiden win, instead finising third. His first win would come at the Hockenheimring, where he took a lights-to-flag victory from pole. Throughout the season, he was an outsider for the championship, and he eventually ended the standings third overall with one race win and eight podiums.

Formula Regional European Championship 

In 2020, Leclerc joined the Formula Regional European Championship for Prema Powerteam alongside Oliver Rasmussen, Gianluca Petecof and 2019 W Series champion Jamie Chadwick, in his first year as a Ferrari junior. He started the season with a pole position hat-trick at the Misano round, taking victory in the second race. Leclerc won again in the first and third races at Paul Ricard, and he took the lead of the championship in Mugello by winning all three races of the round. However, he would lose the lead to teammate Petecof by finishing third, ninth and sixth at the Monza Circuit. Subsequently, both Leclerc and Petecof failed to win any races throughout the remainder of the season. In the final round at Vallelunga the Monegasque driver scored eight points in the first race with a sixth place, but he lost the championship to Petecof after he spun in the final race under wet conditions. On his mental mistake that costed him the title, Leclerc felt "disappointed" and had "no words". Leclerc ended the season in second with 343 points and six victories.

FIA Formula 3 Championship

2021 

Leclerc tested for Prema during the 2020 post-season testing. In 2021 Leclerc was partnered with Olli Caldwell and Red Bull academy member Dennis Hauger at Prema Racing in the FIA Formula 3 Championship. He also competed in the 2021 Virtual Grand Prix Championship for Ferrari, his brother's real-world team. Leclerc had a challenging debut in Barcelona, where he failed to score any points, due to his poor qualifying and a puncture in the first race. Leclerc's Paul Ricard weekend got off to a bad start, unable to start a lap in qualifying due to a suspension failure. He charged all the way to 12th in Race 1 for reverse pole in Race 2. The Monégasque would then take his first victory in Race 2, as well as his first points, before once again coming close to the top ten on Sunday. He would qualify ninth for the Red Bull Ring round, but retired in the first race due to a puncture on lap 10. During the second race, Leclerc amazingly climbed 21 places to end in sixth place, in which he was "really happy". Disappointment would follow in Race 3, as Leclerc lost control while overtaking Victor Martins and slammed into Clément Novalak, bringing an early end to his and Leclerc's race. He was taken to hospital but was discharged later that Sunday, also receiving a three-place grid penalty for the next race due to that incident. 

Leclerc scored his maiden pole position at the Hungaroring. The first two races would come without points and during Race 3, Leclerc maintained his lead until lap 9, where he battled with teammate Hauger and lost out but still finished in second place. Leclerc had an unremarkable round at Spa-Francorchamps, taking two tenth places from Race 2 and Race 3 due to qualifying in 13th. In Zandvoort, Leclerc qualified tenth. He then scored his second win of the season during Race 1, having stormed from third to first at the start and also defending hard from Logan Sargeant. He followed it up with seventh and tenth places in Race 2 and Race 3 respectively. In the Sochi, Leclerc qualified a disappointing 14th, but managed to end with a pair of seventh places. Leclerc ended up tenth in the standings, with one pole, two wins and 79 points, behind Caldwell and title-winning teammate Hauger, but could not prevent Prema from defending the teams' title. He remained with Prema for post-season testing.

2022 

During pre-season, prior to his main campaign, he took part in the Formula Regional Asian Championship with Mumbai Falcons. He won his first race of the championship during the second round, taking the lead of the standings. Leclerc ended the third round with a hat-trick of podiums, including winning the final race. Two more wins followed, where in his later one, he claimed his first single-seater title with two races to spare.

Leclerc was retained by Prema Racing for the 2022 season, partnering fellow Ferrari Driver Academy member Oliver Bearman and Red Bull academy's Jak Crawford. After re-signing with Prema, Leclerc stated that he wanted to be "more consistent" in his sophomore season of Formula 3. His qualifying didn't go to plan in Bahrain, where he only qualified 14th. Leclerc had a successful sprint race, climbing to fifth and nearly pipping fourth place off Zane Maloney. He made another charge in the feature race, finishing second place for his first podium finish of the year. In Imola, things did not start well as he was spun out in qualifying by Enzo Trulli, eventually the Monégasque wounded up 21st. He had a difficult sprint race, but another recovery drive saw Leclerc claim fourth place at the end. Leclerc would start fifth for the Barcelona round, and would finish one place higher in the sprint race. Leclerc's feature race was messy, as a collision with David Vidales a nd erratic driving on Juan Manuel Correa saw him receive two five-second time penalties, and was ended 16th. 

In Silverstone, Leclerc qualified second. Eighth place came in the sprint race having to overtake both of his Prema teammates, before his first and only win of the year came on Sunday. Leclerc would overtake polesitter Zak O'Sullivan in the early stages of the race for victory. Leclerc took victory in the main race at Silverstone, having overtaken Zak O'Sullivan in the early stages of the race. At the Red Bull Ring, he topped practice for the first time and qualified fourth. He would score decent points in the races, finishing eighth and fourth in the sprint and feature races respectively. Leclerc again qualified fourth in Budapest, however a disappointing sprint race would come. Battling for fourth place on the very last lap with teammate Crawford, he crashed into the back of the American, both losing places and points to their rivals. He would carry a five-place grid penalty for the feature race, and after making early progress to sixth place, he fell to eighth as O'Sullivan and Correa passed him on slick tyres at a dry track.

Following the summer break, an energy confusion saw Leclerc down in 20th for Spa-Francorchamps qualifying, but made an electric charge, picking up 15 places for P5 at the flag. He would finish just outside the points in 11th during the feature race. A weekend to forget in Zandvoort saw Leclerc be rewarded without points, and left him an outsider for the title. He qualified fifth during the Monza finale, ahead of both teammates and championship contenders. In the sprint race, he dropped a few places after making contact with Victor Martins, but drove well to finish eighth. In the feature race, he finished in fifth place despite contact with a rival. Leclerc ended the championship in a disappointing sixth place, with one win and one more podium, also claiming 114 points in a season that could have been much better.

FIA Formula 2 Championship 
Following the F2 Yas Marina season finale, Leclerc was announced to be stepping up to Formula 2 with DAMS for the 2023 season, partnering Ayumu Iwasa.

Formula One 
In 2019, Leclerc was signed to the Sauber Junior Team as part of his move to the ADAC Formula 4 Championship. The following year, he was made a member of the Ferrari Driver Academy.

Personal life 
Leclerc has two older brothers, Lorenzo and Charles, the latter of which currently races in Formula One for Ferrari.

Karting record

Karting career summary

Racing record

Racing career summary 

† As Leclerc was a guest driver, he was ineligible to score points.

Complete French F4 Championship results 
(key) (Races in bold indicate pole position) (Races in italics indicate fastest lap)

Complete ADAC Formula 4 Championship results 
(key) (Races in bold indicate pole position) (Races in italics indicate fastest lap)

Complete Formula Regional European Championship results 
(key) (Races in bold indicate pole position) (Races in italics indicate fastest lap)

† Driver did not finish the race, but was classified as they completed more than 90% of the race distance.

Complete FIA Formula 3 Championship results 
(key) (Races in bold indicate pole position; races in italics indicate points for the fastest lap of top ten finishers)

Complete Formula Regional Asian Championship results 
(key) (Races in bold indicate pole position) (Races in italics indicate the fastest lap of top ten finishers)

Complete FIA Formula 2 Championship results 
(key) (Races in bold indicate pole position) (Races in italics indicate points for the fastest lap of top ten finishers)

* Season still in progress.

References

External links 

2000 births
Living people
ADAC Formula 4 drivers
French F4 Championship drivers
Monegasque racing drivers
People from Monte Carlo
Formula Regional Asian Championship drivers
Formula Regional European Championship drivers
FIA Formula 3 Championship drivers
Auto Sport Academy drivers
Charouz Racing System drivers
Prema Powerteam drivers
US Racing drivers
DAMS drivers
Mumbai Falcons drivers
Sauber Motorsport drivers